Jesse Clair Harper (December 10, 1883 – July 31, 1961) was an American football and baseball player, coach, and college athletics administrator.  He served as the head football coach at Alma College (1906–1907), Wabash College (1909–1912), and the University of Notre Dame (1913–1917), compiling a career college football record of 57–17–7.  Harper was inducted into the College Football Hall of Fame as a coach in 1971.

Coaching career

Alma
Harper was the head football coach at Alma College in Alma, Michigan.  He held that position for the 1906 and 1907 seasons.  His coaching record at Alma was 8–3–4.

Wabash
Harper was the 18th head football coach at Wabash College in Crawfordsville, Indiana, and he held that position for four seasons, from 1909 until 1912.  His coaching record at Wabash was 15–9–2.

Notre Dame
Harper is most known for his coaching at the University of Notre Dame. His 1913 football squad posted a 35–13 win over Army, one that is regarded by most football historians as the game that put Notre Dame on the football map.

Later life
Harper stepped down as head football coach after the 1917 season and returned to ranching in his home state of Kansas.  His ranch was not far from where Knute Rockne was killed in a 1931 plane crash. Harper accompanied Rockne's body on the train from Kansas back to South Bend, Indiana, for the funeral and burial.  The University of Notre Dame immediately hired Harper to fill Rockne's role as athletic director, a position in which he remained until 1934, when Elmer Layden became head football coach and athletic director.

Harper was married and had two sons and one daughter.

In 1963, he was inducted into the Hall of Great Westerners of the National Cowboy & Western Heritage Museum for his contributions to the cattle industry.

Head coaching record

Football

References

External links
 
 

1883 births
1961 deaths
American cattlemen
Alma Scots football coaches
Chicago Maroons baseball players
Chicago Maroons football players
Notre Dame Fighting Irish athletic directors
Notre Dame Fighting Irish baseball coaches
Notre Dame Fighting Irish football coaches
Notre Dame Fighting Irish men's basketball coaches
Wabash Little Giants baseball coaches
Wabash Little Giants basketball coaches
Wabash Little Giants football coaches
College Football Hall of Fame inductees
Morgan Park Academy alumni
Ranchers from Kansas
People from Paw Paw, Illinois
Coaches of American football from Illinois
Players of American football from Illinois
Basketball coaches from Illinois